King Cobra is a 1999 Trimark Pictures direct to video horror/sci-fi film directed by Scott Hillenbrand and David Hillenbrand with featured special effects by The Chiodo Brothers. Starring Pat Morita, Scott Hillenbrand, Hoyt Axton, Joseph Ruskin, and Courtney Gains, the film was released April 27, 1999.

In the film, an experiment with snake venom goes wrong and a giant, genetically engineered hybrid of an Asian King Cobra and an Eastern Diamondback Rattlesnake escapes from his lab and into a small town. When snake-bitten bodies turn up everywhere, the mayor of the town wants things hushed up to protect the town's upcoming microbrewery festival. Expert reptile wrangler Nick Hashimoto (Morita) is then hired to bring in the snake before things spiral out of control.

Plot
Loose in the countryside for two years and filled with the experimental aggressiveness drug, the snake, nicknamed "Seth", eventually outgrows his woodland prey and begins hunting the residents of the small brewery town of Filmore. Dr. Brad Kragen (Scott Hillenbrand) conducts an autopsy on a recently found body and determines that the death was caused by a huge snake. He and Police Chief Jo Biddle (Casey Fallo) go to town mayor (and Jo's father) Ed (Hoyt Axton) and demand he cancel an upcoming town lager festival. Ed refuses, but after more deaths, the town eventually brings in herpetologist and hunter Nick "Hash" Hashimoto (Pat Morita).

Cast
 Pat Morita as Nick "Hash" Hashimoto
 Scott Hillenbrand as Dr. Brad Kagen (as Scott Brandon)
 Hoyt Axton as Mayor Ed Biddle
 Joseph Ruskin as Dr. Irwin Burns
 Courtney Gains as Dr. Joseph McConnell
 Eric Lawson as Sheriff Ben Lowry
 Erik Estrada as Bernie Alvarez
 Nick Jameson as Jurgen Werner
 Megan Blake as  Grace Stills
 Casey Fallo as Jo Biddle (as Kasey Fallo)
 Arell Blanton as Jesse
 Jerry Kernion as Conrad
 Michael Leopard as Buck
 Cedric Duplechain as Deputy Bud Fuller
 Paul Morgan Fredrix as Dr. Pat Kagen

Development
When David Hillenbrand and Scott Hillenbrand developed the concept for King Cobra, the film Anaconda was not yet "in the pipeline". They wished to take an approach in the genre in a similar vein as Jaws or Alien. Production problems allowed Anaconda to beat their film to release.

Reception
In 2001, G. Noel Gross of DVD Talk wrote that the snake effects of King Cobra were "better than the CGI-addled Python that followed" and made note of a "hilarious cameo" appearance by Erik Estrada.  Derek Armstrong of Allmovie panned the film, calling it poorly conceived and absurd, with the special effects of the snake "so cheap-looking that it can only be seen in flashes".  DVD Verdict also panned the film, writing that what was promoted as "30 Feet Of Pure Terror!", was "more like 93 minutes of pure boredom". While noting that Trimark gave the film a nice treatment on its DVD release, they concluded that it was "an incredibly worthless film".

Release
It was released on DVD and VHS. Both have since been discontinued and have for long gone out of print. It is available to view on Vudu, Hulu, Amazon Prime Video, and YouTube by LionsgateVOD. It is also available for Google play and  iTunes in some countries.

See also
List of killer snake films

References

External links 
 
 

Films about snakes
1999 films
1999 horror films
American natural horror films
American science fiction horror films
1999 science fiction films
Trimark Pictures films
1990s English-language films
1990s American films